Robbery Beaches are beaches extending along the north side of Byers Peninsula, Livingston Island in the South Shetland Islands, Antarctica between Essex Point to the west and Nedelya Point to the east. They are crossed by Eridanus Stream and Bedek Stream.

The name ‘Robbery Beach’ was used by James Weddell in 1820–23.  It arose from the English robbery of sealskins collected by the American brig Charity (Capt. Charles H. Barnard) of New York in January 1821.  There was fierce competition between British and American sealers in the area during the early 1820s.

Location

Maps
 Chart of South Shetland including Coronation Island, &c. from the exploration of the sloop Dove in the years 1821 and 1822 by George Powell Commander of the same. Scale ca. 1:200000. London: Laurie, 1822
 Península Byers, Isla Livingston. Mapa topográfico a escala 1:25000. Madrid: Servicio Geográfico del Ejército, 1992. (Map image on p. 55 of the linked study)
 L.L. Ivanov et al. Antarctica: Livingston Island and Greenwich Island, South Shetland Islands. Scale 1:100000 topographic map. Sofia: Antarctic Place-names Commission of Bulgaria, 2005.
 L.L. Ivanov. Antarctica: Livingston Island and Greenwich, Robert, Snow and Smith Islands. Scale 1:120000 topographic map.  Troyan: Manfred Wörner Foundation, 2009.  
 Antarctic Digital Database (ADD). Scale 1:250000 topographic map of Antarctica. Scientific Committee on Antarctic Research (SCAR). Since 1993, regularly upgraded and updated.
 L.L. Ivanov. Antarctica: Livingston Island and Smith Island. Scale 1:100000 topographic map. Manfred Wörner Foundation, 2017.

In fiction
Robbery Beaches are part of the mise-en-scène in the Antarctica thriller novel The Killing Ship authored by Elizabeth Cruwys and Beau Riffenburgh under their joint alias Simon Beaufort in 2016, and are shown on a sketch map of Livingston Island illustrating the book.

Gallery

Notes

References
 Robbery Beaches. SCAR Composite Antarctic Gazetteer.

Beaches of Livingston Island